General Forsyth may refer to:

James W. Forsyth (1834–1906), U.S. Army major general
John Forsyth (general) (1867–1928), Australian Army major general

See also
George I. Forsythe (1918–1987), U.S. Army lieutenant general